The Northern Fujiwara (奥州藤原氏 Ōshū Fujiwara-shi) were a Japanese noble family that ruled the Tōhoku region (the northeast of Honshū) of Japan during the 12th century as their own realm. The Ōshū Fujiwara were one of the four great clans during the Heian period — the other three were the Minamoto, the Taira, and the Tachibana.

They succeeded the semi-independent Emishi families of the 11th century who were gradually brought down by the Minamoto clan loyal to the Imperial Court in Kyoto. They ruled over an independent region that derived its wealth from gold mining, horse trading and as middlemen in the trade in luxury items from continental Asian states and from the far northern Emishi and Ainu people. They were able to keep their independence vis-a-vis Kyoto by the strength of their warrior bands until they were ultimately conquered by the Kantō samurai clans led by Minamoto no Yoritomo, in the Battle of Ōshū in 1189.

Origins 
Historically, there has been a theory that the Northern Fujiwara descended from the ethnic Emishi people, but in terms of genealogy, they were descended from Fujiwara no Hidesato.

Fujiwara no Kiyohira was raised as a member of the Seiwa Genji (a lineage of the Minamoto clan) as his mother remarried into a Seiwa Genji family in Dewa Province. However, Kiyohira, along with Minamoto no Yoshiie, became independent and established themselves in Hiraizumi (in present-day Iwate Prefecture) in 1087.

History 
After its foundation by Fujiwara no Kiyohira in 1087, the Northern Fujiwara clan ruled the Mutsu and Dewa Province for over a century.

Along with Kiyohira, the next two generations of Fujiwara no Motohira and Hidehira saw the zenith of Northern Fujiwara's power in the Tōhoku region. At the zenith of their rule, they attracted a number of artisans from Kyoto and created a capital city, Hiraizumi. They introduced the Kyoto culture into the area and built many temples, such as the Chūson-ji founded in 1095.

During the Genpei War (1180-1185), fought between the Minamoto clan and the Taira clan, the Northern Fujiwara remained neutral and did not participate in the war.

A conflict erupted between Minamoto no Yoritomo and the Northern Fujiwara over the extradition of Minamoto no Yoshitsune, who had fled to Hiraizumi. Hidehira had remained neutral during the Genpei War, but when Yoshitsune took refuge in Hiraizumi, he decided to protect him.

Hidehira, who had protected Yoshitsune, soon died and his son Fujiwara no Yasuhira succeeded his father as the 4th head of the Northern Fujiwara clan. Yasuhira failed to resist Minamoto no Yoritomo's pressure, and had Yoshitsune assassinated. After Yoshitsune was assassinated in April 1189, his severed head was delivered to Kamakura by July for Yoritomo to see. However, Yoritomo was already set about attacking Hiraizumi and this had no effect to fix the damaged relations.

On September 1, 1189, 284,000 cavalrymen led by Yoritomo set out to attack Hiraizumi. Yasuhira prepared himself an army of 170,000 cavalrymen to defend his realm. Thus, the Battle of Ōshū began.

Yasuhira's forces were defeated one after another, and on October 2, he fled Hiraizumi leaving it afire. Yoritomo entered Hiraizumi the next day. Yasuhira was found and killed in Nienosaku, Hinai, Mutsu Province (present-day Ōdate, Akita Prefecture) on October 14.

The Battle of Ōshū resulted in the destruction of the Northern Fujiwara. This marked the end of the period of civil war that began in 1180, and the completion of Yoritomo's nationwide domination and the establishment of the Kamakura shogunate.

Notable members 
Below is a family tree of the Fujiwaras who show up most frequently in historical accounts. 
　 　

 

*a.k.a. Izumi (no) Saburo

(Adopted kin are not shown.)

See also
Hokke (Fujiwara)
Fujiwara clan

References

Hudson, Mark J.. 1999. “Ainu Ethnogenesis and the Northern Fujiwara”. Arctic Anthropology 36 (1/2). University of Wisconsin Press: 73–83. https://www.jstor.org/stable/40316506.

Tōhoku region
12th century in Japan
Rikuchu Province